Trypanothrips is a genus of thrips in the family Phlaeothripidae.

Species
 Trypanothrips coxalis

References

Phlaeothripidae
Thrips
Thrips genera